Malca, is a French-Moroccan musician specializing in electro fusion. He draws influence from  African American music, Algerian rai, and Moroccan chaabi.

Biography 
Malca was born in Paris, France. He grew up in Casablanca, Morocco. In an interview with Huffington Post Maroc, Malca explained his interest in Casablanca, describing it as "a schizophrenic, young, miscegenated city, where different elements—such as vestiges of the French Colonial Empire, ghosts of an American dream dominated by ultra-capitalism, and massive, somewhat vulgar structures borrowing from the Middle East—are married." He also described himself as "a young man obsessed with East-West dialogue."

Discography

Casablanca Jungle EP 
The Casablanca Jungle EP was released by Jelly Robots Records on November 17, 2017. The music video for the title track "Casablanca Jungle" was shot in Casablanca.

 "Casablanca Jungle (Extended Version)"
 "Shalom"
 "Ya Layli"
 "Wham"
 "I'm Not a Legend"

References 

Living people
French people of Moroccan descent
Year of birth missing (living people)